Kimiko Shihara Raheem (born 28 January 1999) is a Sri Lankan national swimmer who has represented her country at several international competitions. She represented her country at the 2016 Olympic Games in Rio de Janeiro, Brazil. She won multiple gold medals at the 2016 South Asian Games in the backstroke and freestyle events. She won the highest number of medals by a Sri Lankan woman at the 2016 South Asian Games in India, and was named Best Female Athlete of the Games by the Bangladesh Sports Press Association. She is the younger sister of Mayumi Raheem and Machiko Raheem both of whom hold national records themselves. She was a semi-finalist at the 100m backstroke event at the 2014 Commonwealth Games in Glasgow. She holds numerous Sri Lankan national records and South Asian records in her name.

Raheem currently lives in Phuket, Thailand where she trained at the Thanyapura Aquatic Training Centre from mid-2015 leading up to the Olympic Games. This was under a FINA scholarship awarded to multiple swimmers from several countries. Cherantha de Silva was the other Sri Lankan swimmer who was given a scholarship by FINA. She went to the British International School in Phuket, but currently is finishing her high school in the United World College of Thailand. She has previously lived in Sri Lanka, New Zealand, Singapore and Qatar.

In February 2018, Raheem was named to Sri Lanka's 2018 Commonwealth Games team.

References

External links
 
 Olympic bio

Commonwealth Games competitors for Sri Lanka
Living people
1999 births
Swimmers from Colombo
Olympic swimmers of Sri Lanka
Sri Lankan female swimmers
Sri Lankan Malays
Swimmers at the 2014 Commonwealth Games
Swimmers at the 2016 Summer Olympics
South Asian Games gold medalists for Sri Lanka
South Asian Games silver medalists for Sri Lanka
South Asian Games medalists in swimming
Female backstroke swimmers
Female breaststroke swimmers
Sri Lankan female freestyle swimmers